Mark Anthony Davis (born April 26, 1973) is an American former professional basketball player who played in the NBA, among other leagues.

Career 
Davis, a 6 ft 7 in small forward, attended Howard College in Big Spring, Texas, and Texas Tech University before being selected 19th in the second round (48th overall) by the Minnesota Timberwolves in the 1995 NBA Draft. He also spent time with the Philadelphia 76ers, Miami Heat, and Golden State Warriors, amongst others.

College
1991–93 Howard College: 58 games
1993–95 Texas Tech Red Raiders: 58 games

Professional
1995–96 Minnesota Timberwolves (National Basketball Association, 2nd round, 48th): 3.3 ppg
1996–97 Philadelphia 76ers (NBA): 8.5 ppg
1997–98 Philadelphia 76ers: 4.0 ppg
1998–99 January '99 signed by La Crosse Bobcats (Continental Basketball Association); signed by Miami Heat (NBA): 4 games, 2.3 ppg
1999–2000 Golden State Warriors (NBA): 6.2 ppg; December '99 signed by La Crosse Bobcats (CBA)
2000 Golden State Warriors: two ten-day contracts
2000–01 Signed with Viola Reggio Calabria (Serie A); then played shortly with Toronto Raptors (NBA)
2001–02 Signed with Phoenix Eclipse (American Basketball Association) but saw no playing time; signed with Dakota Wizards (CBA): 4 games; signed with Sioux Falls Skyforce (CBA): 16 games
2003–04 Hapoel Galil Elyon (Ligat Winner): 12 games; Maccabi Rishon LeZion (Ligat Winner): 9 games
2007 Science City Jena (Basketball Bundesliga): 27 games
2009 Lappeenrannan NMKY (Korisliiga)

References

External links
 Official Site
  

1973 births
Living people
African-American basketball players
American expatriate basketball people in Finland
American expatriate basketball people in Germany
American expatriate basketball people in Israel
American expatriate basketball people in Italy
American men's basketball players
Basketball players from Louisiana
Dakota Wizards (CBA) players
Golden State Warriors players
Science City Jena players
Hapoel Galil Elyon players
Howard Hawks men's basketball players
Israeli Basketball Premier League players
La Crosse Bobcats players
Maccabi Rishon LeZion basketball players
Miami Heat players
Minnesota Timberwolves draft picks
Minnesota Timberwolves players
Philadelphia 76ers players
Sioux Falls Skyforce (CBA) players
Small forwards
Sportspeople from Thibodaux, Louisiana
Texas Tech Red Raiders basketball players
Wonju DB Promy players
American expatriate basketball people in the Philippines
Philippine Basketball Association imports
Sta. Lucia Realtors players
21st-century African-American sportspeople
20th-century African-American sportspeople